, born Andō Kichirō (安藤吉次郎) or Katsusaburō (勝三郎), was a Japanese painter and printmaker of the Edo period, famous both for his Western-style yōga paintings, in imitation of Dutch oil painting styles, methods, and themes, which he painted as Kōkan, and his ukiyo-e prints,  which he created under the name Harushige, but also producing forgeries of the works of Suzuki Harunobu. He is said to have boasted of his ability to forge the great master so well. He also was engaged  in Western learning (Rangaku) in the field of astronomy.

Life
Kōkan started his artistic career at the age of 15 at the Kanō school in Edo, but left the school six years later. He was influenced then by Suzuki Harunobu and Sō Shiseki. In 1773 he met Hiraga Gennai. Kōkan mastered a number of very different styles, and was also a great innovator, exploring new methods and styles on his own. He became the first Japanese artist, in 1783, to use copperplate engraving, a print, called View on Mimeguri. Following Harunobu's death in 1770, Kōkan placed Harunobu's signature on a number of his own prints, which were supposedly accepted as true works of Harunobu at the time. Today, art historians have noted the distinctive calligraphic style of the faked Harunobu signature, the use of Western-style perspective, and the somewhat less delicate figures in works by "Harunobe" (Kōkan).

Like many other Edo period artists, Kōkan used a great variety of other names at various points in his career, though "Shiba Kōkan", "Suzuki Harushige", and close variations on those appear far more often. Variations include Shiba Shun （司馬峻）and Suzuki Shun, while his other names include A Fugen-dōjin, Kungaku, Rantei, and as a writer Shumparō （春波楼）.

Kōkan lived in Edo, was a student of rangaku (Dutch studies) in addition to his pursuits as an artist, and interested in astronomy in particular. He wrote and illustrated a book on Copernicus' theories, entitled Kopperu temmon zukai (刻白爾（コッペル）天文図解, Illustrated Explanation of Copernicus' Astronomy). He met Hendrik Caspar Romberg, the Dutch embassy visiting the Shōgun at Edo, but visited  Nagasaki only once, in 1788.

"Shiba Kokan's world map, published in 1792 in two hand-drawn sheets, shows in the surrounding diagrams the Copernicus figures of earth, sun and moon, which his accompanying book explained with more diagrams. The ever-original Shiba Kokan describes himself in the colophon as introducing copper engraving technologies to Japan. Later impressions added considerably to the surrounding decorations, with small scenes of whaling, of hills and harbours and plant dissection; they are also more fully colored, in homage to Willem Blaeu or popular taste. However, Shiba Kokan's spare, early issue still conveys a sense of innovation."

Gallery

Remarks

Notes

References
Naruse, F.: Shiba Kōkan. Shueisha 1977 (in Japanese)
Roberts, L. Japanese Artists. Weatehrhill 1976

External links
 

Shiba Kokan
Shiba Kokan
Shiba Kokan
Ukiyo-e artists
Yōga painters
Japanese cartographers
Artists from Tokyo
18th-century Japanese artists
19th-century Japanese painters
People of Edo-period Japan